The Adventures of Sebastian Cole is a 1998 American comedy-drama film written and directed by Tod Williams and starring Adrian Grenier as the title character.

Plot
In June 1983 in Dutchess County, New York, Sebastian Cole's stepmother, who formerly went by Hank and presented as male, outs herself and announces that she is having a sex change operation. Sebastian's sister, Jessica, leaves immediately for California, and his mother, Joan, takes him back to England. Eight months later, Sebastian is back in the United States, knocking on his stepmother's door. Now named Henrietta, she takes Sebastian in and supports him over the next few months of high school. Sebastian's "adventures" are mostly self-destructive.

Cast
 Adrian Grenier as Sebastian Cole
 Clark Gregg as Hank/Henrietta Rossi
 Aleksa Palladino as Mary
 Margaret Colin as Joan Cole
 John Shea as Hartley
 Marni Lustig as Jessica Cole
 Joan Copeland as Grandma Cole
 Tom Lacy as Grandpa Cole
 Gabriel Macht as Troy
 Russel Harper as Wayne
 Rory Cochrane as Chinatown
 Famke Janssen as Fiona
 Nicole Ari Parker as Nurse Jenny
 Marisol Padilla Sánchez as Woman in Desert
 Levon Helm as Bob

Reception
On Rotten Tomatoes, the film has an approval rating of 46% based on reviews from 24 critics, with an average rating of 5.8/10.

Roger Ebert gave the film three out of four stars, noting that the film avoids easy cliche in favour of a more thoughtful approach to the subject matter. He gave particular praise to Clark Gregg saying that, whilst one is never in doubt about his gender because of his physical appearance, "in his heart he knows he is a woman, and he is true to that inner conviction with a courage that the film doesn't need to underline, because it permeates the performance". Stephen Holden of The New York Times praised Adrian Greiner's performance feeling that it "beautifully captures his character's precarious balance of naivete and bravado, self-destructiveness and self-invention".

Writing in Variety, Joe Leydon believed that the scenes between Gregg and Grenier were the strongest (although he felt that Gregg's portrayal came close to caricature). He was critical of the technical aspects of the film's production, felt that other films had covered similar ground better and that the ending was poorly conceived and too abrupt. He predicted that the film would perform poorly with critics and at the box office. Entertainment Weekly's Owen Gleiberman gave the film a "B" rating, adding that he wished it had been better structured, although the current configuration was "integral" to its "charm".

See also
 List of American films of 1998
 Transgender in film and television

References

External links
 
 
 

1998 films
1990s coming-of-age comedy-drama films
1998 LGBT-related films
American coming-of-age comedy-drama films
American LGBT-related films
American teen comedy-drama films
1990s English-language films
Films about dysfunctional families
Films directed by Tod Williams
Films set in the 1980s
Films set in 1983
Films set in New York (state)
Films set in New York City
Films shot in New York (state)
American independent films
Paramount Vantage films
Films about trans women
1998 independent films
1990s teen comedy-drama films
LGBT-related coming-of-age films
1990s American films